Bodo Kirchhoff (born 6 July 1948) is a German writer and novelist. He was born in Hamburg before moving with his family to Kirchzarten in the Black Forest in 1955, which he describes as a culture shock. In addition to writing literary fiction, he has worked on various projects for German television, such as long-runner Tatort, and has written movie screenplays. One of his best-known novels is Infanta (1990), which has been translated into more than a dozen languages.  In 2016, his novel, which features an African migrant in Italy, Encounter won the German Book Prize.

Life 
Bodo Kirchhoff received his high school diploma in 1968.  After this he spent two years in the military, followed by a year selling ice cream in the United States of America. From 1972 to 1979 he studied pedagogy and psychology at Frankfurt University and completed his doctoral thesis on Jacques Lacan. During this period he was noticed by Suhrkamp, with whom he published until he switched to Frankfurter Verlagsanstalt, and published a both a novel and a play in 1979, beginning his career as a prolific author and multiple prize winner.

In the 1980s, he traveled extensively and wrote for the magazine TransAtlantik.  Though he wrote nonfiction for this magazine, many of his experiences inspired his fictional works.

In 1993 he evaluated the German Army's participation in UNOSOM.  After this he was the 1994–95 Lecturer at the prestigious Frankfurt lectures.  His topic was legends about your own body.

In 2010 Kirchhoff revealed in an article in Der Spiegel that as a twelve-year-old schoolboy, he had been sexually abused by the choirmaster at his boarding school, which he began attending in 1959, after the divorce of his parents, by Lake Constance. He has said that his work, as a consequence, often has as its theme "the reconciliation between sexuality and language"

In 1987 he married editor and lecturer Ulrike Bauer.  Together they have two children, Claudius, born 1988, and Sophia, born 1993.  Since 2003, they have offered week-long writing courses at the cost of €1900 at their home in Italy.

Awards
1984: Jahreskunstpreis des Frankfurter Vereins für Künstlerhilfe
1989: Villa Massimo scholarship, Rome
1999: Bayerischer Filmpreis – Award for Screenplay
2001: Rheingau Literatur Preis
2002: Deutscher Kritikerpreis
2002: Preis der LiteraTour Nord
2008: Carl-Zuckmayer-Medaille for Services to the German Language
2012: Shortlisted for the German Book Prize with Die Liebe in groben Zügen
2016: Winner of the German Book Prize with Widerfahrnis

Reviews for Encounter

Screenplays
1997: Tatort: , Director: Bodo Fürneisen
2000: Tatort: , Director: Josef Rödl
2002: , Director: Oliver Hirschbiegel
2004: Die Konferenz, Director: Niki Stein

Works
 Ohne Eifer, Ohne Zorn. Novelle. Suhrkamp, Frankfurt am Main 1979, . Neuausgabe 2013, Frankfurter Verlagsanstalt, Frankfurt am Main 
 Das Kind oder Die Vernichtung von Neuseeland. Schauspiel, Suhrkamp, Frankfurt am Main 1978, DNB 790146029, Uraufführung Saarbrücken 1979.
 Die Einsamkeit der Haut. Erzählung. Suhrkamp, Frankfurt am Main 1981, .
 Zwiefalten. Roman. Suhrkamp, Frankfurt am Main 1983, .
 Mexikanische Novelle. Suhrkamp, Frankfurt am Main 1984, .
 Infanta. Roman. Suhrkamp, Frankfurt am Main 1990, . Unveränderte Neuauflage: Frankfurter Verlagsanstalt, Frankfurt am Main 2006, .
 Der Sandmann. Roman. Suhrkamp, Frankfurt am Main 1992, .
 Die Weihnachtsfrau. Frankfurter Verlagsanstalt, Frankfurt am Main 1997, .
 Manila. Filmbuch. Suhrkamp, Frankfurt am Main 2000, .
 Parlando. Roman. Frankfurter Verlagsanstalt, Frankfurt am Main 2001, .
 Schundroman. Frankfurter Verlagsanstalt, Frankfurt am Main 2002, .
 Wo das Meer beginnt. Frankfurter Verlagsanstalt, Frankfurt am Main 2004, .
 Die kleine Garbo. Frankfurter Verlagsanstalt, Frankfurt am Main 2006, .
 Der Prinzipal. Frankfurter Verlagsanstalt, Frankfurt am Main 2007, .
 Eros und Asche. Ein Freundschaftsroman. Frankfurter Verlagsanstalt, Frankfurt am Main 2007, .
 Erinnerungen an meinen Porsche. Roman, Hoffmann und Campe 2009, .
 Die Liebe in groben Zügen. Roman. Frankfurter Verlagsanstalt, Frankfurt am Main 2012, .
 Verlangen und Melancholie. Roman. Frankfurter Verlagsanstalt, Frankfurt am Main 2014, .
 Widerfahrnis. Novelle. Frankfurter Verlagsanstalt, Frankfurt am Main 2016, .
 Betreff: Einladung zu einer Kreuzfahrt. Roman. Frankfurter Verlagsanstalt, Frankfurt am Main 2017, .

References

20th-century German novelists
1948 births
Living people
German male novelists
20th-century German male writers
German Book Prize winners